The Renaissance Society of America (RSA) is an academic association founded in 1954 supporting the study of the Renaissance period, 1300–1650. The RSA brings together scholars from many backgrounds in a wide variety of disciplines from North America and around the world. RSA has over 5,000 members at universities and colleges as professors, instructors, and graduate students; at museums, libraries, and other cultural institutions; independent scholars; and many others interested in Renaissance studies. Its headquarters are in New York City; the annual meeting takes place in changing cities within North America and in Europe.

With the University of Chicago Press, the RSA publishes the Renaissance Quarterly (ISSN 0034-4338) a peer-reviewed publication which began in the 1940s as Renaissance News and was renamed beginning with volume 20 in 1967. It subsumed a separate publication, Studies in the Renaissance, in 1975; Studies was published by the University of Chicago Press from 1954 to 1974 (ISSN 0081-8658, vols. 1-21) and is indexed by JSTOR. It also publishes an internal newsletter (Renaissance News & Notes), and the Renaissance Society of America Reprint Text Series.

The Society offers a number of awards for members, including the RSA-TCP (Text Creation Partnership) Prize for digital research in the Renaissance, the Phyllis Goodhart Gordan Prize for the best book published in Renaissance studies, the Gladys Krieble Delmas Foundation Book Prize for the best book published in Renaissance Venetian studies, and the William Nelson Prize for the best article in Renaissance Quarterly.

References

External links 

Historical societies of the United States
1954 establishments in the United States
Historical societies in New York City